The Bugs Bunny Show is a long-running American animated anthology television series hosted by Bugs Bunny that was mainly composed of theatrical Looney Tunes and Merrie Melodies cartoons released by Warner Bros. between 1948 and 1969. The show originally debuted as a primetime half-hour program on ABC in 1960, featuring three theatrical Looney Tunes cartoons with new linking sequences produced by the Warner Bros. Cartoons staff.

After two seasons, The Bugs Bunny Show moved to Saturday mornings, where it remained in one format or another for nearly four decades. The show's title and length changed regularly over the years, as did the network: both ABC and CBS broadcast versions of The Bugs Bunny Show. In 2000, the series, by then known as The Bugs Bunny & Tweety Show, was canceled after the Looney Tunes and Merrie Melodies libraries became the exclusive property of the Cartoon Network family of cable TV networks in the United States. Reruns of The Bugs Bunny and Tweety Show were aired on the Canadian channels Teletoon and Teletoon's sister channel, Teletoon Retro (until 2015 when Teletoon Retro signed off). Prior to Teletoon and Teletoon Retro, CBC Television (1960–1975) and Global Television Network (1978–1982, 1990–2000) aired the show. In Australia, episodes of the show were divided between three networks, with most episodes aired on Nine Network, and some episodes divided between Network Ten, and Seven Network since its debut. In Asia, the program was aired in Japan and South Korea in the early 1960's and also aired on ABS-CBN and RPN in the Philippines, it was also aired on TPI (now MNCTV) from mid 1990's to early 2000's and RCTI during 2000's in Indonesia as well.

Broadcast and format history

The Bugs Bunny Show in prime time, 1960-1962
The original Bugs Bunny Show debuted on ABC prime time in the United States on October 11, 1960, airing on Tuesdays at 7:30 PM ET, under the sponsorship of General Foods (Post cereals, Tang, etc.). Newly produced linking segments were done for each episode by the Warner Bros. animation staff. Chuck Jones and Friz Freleng produced, directed, and created the storyboards for the earliest of these, with Robert McKimson later taking over the direction while Jones and Freleng continued producing and writing. The wraparounds were produced in color, although the original broadcasts of the show were in black-and-white. A total of 52 episodes were made.

Rather than display the full Warner Bros. logo and opening title/credits sequence of each cartoon shown in each episode (as shown in the original theatrical versions and could take up to 20 seconds), new title cards were created to begin each cartoon, and displayed for only about five seconds over a newly composed musical cue; the card omitted the Warner Bros. logo and any detailed credits of the animators, and simply featured the title of the cartoon in bold letters on a plain background, the main character of the cartoon standing off to one side, and the copyright notice of the cartoon rendered in a smaller font at the bottom, before cutting directly to the opening scene of the cartoon, these cuts were sometimes awkward depending on how the original opening sequence was animated. A general credits line was shown at the end of each full episode: "Stories, Animation, layouts, and backgrounds: Members of Motion Picture Screen Cartoonists Local 839." (The Looney Tunes and Merrie Melodies cartoons syndicated to local stations as a package, beginning in the 1950s, generally retained the original opening title sequences as shown in theaters.)

The show's theme song was "This Is It", written by Mack David and Jerry Livingston ("Overture/curtain, lights/this is it/the night of nights..."). The opening title sequence, animated by Freleng unit animator Gerry Chiniquy, features Bugs and Daffy Duck performing the song in unison. For the final chorus, a lineup of Looney Tunes characters joins Bugs and Daffy onstage (Porky Pig, however, is absent from the procession, although Porky had a spin-off show based on the original Bugs Bunny Show 4 years later titled The Porky Pig Show which aired on ABC from 1964 to 1967).

The Bugs Bunny Show proved beneficial to the Warner Bros. cartoon staff, as it allowed the studio to remain open despite the shrinking market for theatrical animated shorts. The final first-run episode of the original Bugs Bunny Show aired on August 7, 1962, and the Warner Bros. animation studio closed the following spring.

The move to Saturday mornings, 1962–1985
ABC began re-running The Bugs Bunny Show on Saturday mornings in April 1962 until September 1967 when it was moved to Sunday mornings for the remainder of its run. The series was rerun in color beginning in 1965, and remained on ABC until September 1968. At this point, the series switched to CBS, where it was combined with The Road Runner Show (which had aired on CBS since 1966) to create The Bugs Bunny/Road Runner Hour. The standard Bugs Bunny Show opening and the announcer's introduction of Bugs Bunny ("that Oscar-winning rabbit!") were directly followed by the rabbit's saying, "...and also starring my fast feathered friend, the Road Runner", after which The Road Runner Show's theme was played. The Bugs Bunny/Road Runner Hour combined re-edited bridging sequences from both shows to link the seven cartoons featured in each episode. The bridging sequences would be edited further in later versions of the Bugs Bunny/Road Runner Hour.

In 1971, The Road Runner Show moved to ABC, and a reconstituted half-hour Bugs Bunny Show aired on CBS, featuring re-edited versions of the bridging sequences and a different grouping of cartoons. In 1973, The Bugs Bunny Show returned to ABC for two seasons, only for CBS to re-acquire both shows and bring back The Bugs Bunny/Road Runner Hour in 1975. In 1976, Sylvester and Tweety were featured in their own Sylvester and Tweety Show for one year, necessitating the removal of most of the Tweety and/or Sylvester cartoons on Bugs Bunny/Road Runner that season. Also that year, a weekly half-hour prime-time edition of The Bugs Bunny/Road Runner Show briefly aired on CBS' Tuesday night schedule from April through June.

The Bugs Bunny/Road Runner Hour became The Bugs Bunny/Road Runner Show in November 1977 after CBS added another half-hour to the runtime. In 1981, a companion Sylvester & Tweety, Daffy, and Speedy Show was added to the CBS schedule, which included a number of later cartoons produced by a reestablished Warner Bros. Cartoons studio from 1967 to 1969. The following year, this new companion series was canceled, and its cartoons were incorporated into The Bugs Bunny/Road Runner Show, which was broadcast as two separate hour-long programs on Saturday mornings (for the second program, the show's opening titles were re-animated). In 1983, CBS returned the show to 90 minutes and the bridging sequences were dropped. The following year, the "This Is It" opening was jettisoned altogether; a new title sequence (created from clips of the cartoons) and new theme song ("It's Cartoon Gold"), composed by Steve Zuckerman with lyrics by John Klawitter, introduced the show.

Final Saturday morning years, 1985–2000
CBS gave up the rights to broadcast the Warner Bros. cartoons following the 1984–1985 season, and as a result, the show moved back to ABC, where it became The Bugs Bunny/Looney Tunes Comedy Hour. Cartoons featuring Tweety or Speedy Gonzales were not broadcast on ABC during the 1985–86 season, the latter presumably due to Mexican stereotypes. The following year, however, Tweety cartoons were added to the program, which was reduced to a half-hour and renamed The Bugs Bunny & Tweety Show. Beginning with its third season, The Bugs Bunny & Tweety Show was expanded to a full hour, and the original "This Is It" theme was reintroduced with similar animation as the original, accompanied by the introductory sequence introduced in 1982. Another version of the "This Is It" opening sequence was done in 1992 with different character animations.

Though the program did not qualify for the educational/informational designation, it nonetheless remained on Saturday mornings after the new designation debuted in 1996, one of the few non-E/I programs to survive the rules changes. The previous year, ABC was bought by The Walt Disney Company, and The Bugs Bunny & Tweety Show was the only non-Disney cartoon to remain on the lineup, due to their contract not being up yet, and was in the first few years of the Disney's One Saturday Morning block starting in 1997 (with the Disney logo omitted from the blocks bumpers during the show). The program was often paired with ABC's in-house Schoolhouse Rock! shorts during this time.

The hour-long Bugs Bunny & Tweety Show remained on the air until 1999, when it was again reduced to a half-hour. In 2000, Warner Bros. made the Looney Tunes and Merrie Melodies film library exclusive to Cartoon Network, which Time Warner owned as part of the purchase of Turner Broadcasting in 1996. As a result, The Bugs Bunny Show ended its nearly four-decade-long network run, one of the longest runs in the history of United States network television. Outside cartoons in the public domain, Warner Bros. cartoons would not return to American broadcast television until the 2021 debut of Toon In with Me on MeTV, along with a companion Saturday morning block.

Legacy
This show is credited for keeping the Warner Bros. cartoons made during the Golden Age of American animation a part of the American consciousness. Indeed, the show ran for almost four decades, and helped inspire animators, comedians, historians, and others who watched Saturday morning television.

The "This Is It" song's fame is such that it has been used elsewhere, such as in the Canadian province of Ontario where it was used in a TV commercial promoting the various performing arts tourist attractions where artists of various disciplines sing separate lines of the song.  In "The Opera," an episode from the fourth season of the US sitcom Seinfeld, Jerry sings "This Is It" to Elaine while both characters are waiting outside the theater, causing Elaine to exclaim, "You know it is so sad, all your knowledge of high culture comes from Bugs Bunny cartoons."

When Warner Bros. released its video series "Golden Jubilee", featuring the classic cartoons, the opening sequence shows the Tasmanian Devil maniacally riding a motorcycle down a city street, chased by a police car. He makes a sharp turn into a theater, where the rest of the Looney Tunes are performing to the Bugs Bunny Show tune.

In 2021, the original "This is It" opening sequence was re-edited into the intro to Bugs Bunny and Friends as part of the Saturday Morning Cartoons block on MeTV.

Animated sequences produced for the show 

A series of short animated scenes were produced for the show, featured "linking" moments during the fictional theater setting of the show. These scenes included:
 The opening teaser showed Bugs Bunny and Daffy Duck performing a duet about the start of the cartoon show; as they sing it, in the background crossing the stage are some of co stars' regulars:Tweety Bird; Speedy Gonzales; Pepé Le Pew; Sylvester the Cat; Road Runner; Hippety Hopper (aka Giant Mouse); Yosemite Sam; Elmer Fudd; Wile E. Coyote; Foghorn Leghorn.
 A frustrated Daffy Duck bickering on stage with Bugs Bunny. Daffy declares, "Last week you said you were going to introduce me next week!"  Bugs replies, "Right...but this isn't next week, is it?"  Daffy trips himself up and replies, "You're doggone tootin' is isn't! This is this week! And next week is uhhh...ummm...sheesh!"
 A barking sheepdog wanders into the theater, saying "Which way did he go?  Where's the little bunny I saw on TV last week?" Daffy, at this time, has dressed up in a rabbit costume and is on stage pretending to be Bugs. The sheepdog pounces upon Daffy and exclaims, "At last, at last!  I have caught a bunny rabbit!"
 Bugs entertains the audience by playing a guitar. An angry Yosemite Sam barges in the theater shouting, "Can't ya see I'm tryin' to sleep?!?", snatches the guitar from Bugs, and snaps all of its strings.
 Bugs demonstrates some cartoon physics, including slow motion, fast speed and "virbrating to a stop."

The show's title sequences and some of these linking material scenes from the original Bugs Bunny Show are included as bonus features on each volume of the Looney Tunes Golden Collection DVD collection (with the exception of Volume 6). As the original color negatives were cut up by CBS and ABC to create later versions of the show, the linking sequences are presented on DVD using a combination of footage from both what's left of the color negatives (some of which were used in later incarnations, thus helping to preserve them) and the black-and-white ABC broadcast prints prepared in the early 1960s.

On the Looney Tunes Golden Collection: Volume 2, the opening to the Bugs Bunny/Road Runner Show (with the announcer calling it the Bugs Bunny/Road Runner Hour) and two openings to the Bugs Bunny and Tweety Show (the 1988 opening and the 1992 opening) were released as special features.

In 2009, an episode of the Bugs Bunny Show in color was released on the Saturday Morning Cartoons 1960s Volume 2 set. Saturday Morning Cartoons 1970s Volume 2 includes an episode of the Bugs Bunny/Road Runner Show.

List of Original Primetime Episodes

Season 1 (1960–1961)

Season 2 (1961–1962)

Formats
Prime Time:
 The Bugs Bunny Show, October 11, 1960 – August 7, 1962 (ABC)

Saturday Mornings:
 The Bugs Bunny Show, April 7, 1962 – September 8, 1968 (in color starting September 10, 1966) (ABC)
 The Bugs Bunny/Road Runner Hour, September 14, 1968 – September 4, 1971 (CBS)
 The Bugs Bunny Show, September 11, 1971 – September 1, 1973 (CBS)
 The Bugs Bunny Show, September 8, 1973 - August 30, 1975 (ABC)
 The Bugs Bunny/Road Runner Hour, September 6, 1975 – November 12, 1977 (CBS)
 The Bugs Bunny/Road Runner Show, November 19, 1977 – September 7, 1985 (CBS)
 The Bugs Bunny/Looney Tunes Comedy Hour, September 7, 1985 – September 6, 1986 (ABC)
 The Bugs Bunny & Tweety Show, September 13, 1986 – September 2, 2000 (ABC)

Credits
 Senior Directors: Chuck Jones, Friz Freleng, Robert McKimson
 Co-directors: Hawley Pratt, Gerry Chiniquy, Art Davis, Abe Levitow, Maurice Noble, Alex Lovy, David Detiege, Rudy Larriva, Tom Ray
 Stories, Animation, layouts, and backgrounds: Members of Motion Picture Screen Cartoonists Local 839
 Music: Carl W. Stalling, Milt Franklyn, John Seely, William Lava, William L. Hendricks, Walter Greene, Eugene Poddany, Doug Goodwin, Rob Walsh, Quinn Amper, Fred Strittmatter, Dean Elliot
 The Bugs Bunny Show Opening and Closing Theme: "This Is It" by Mack David & Jerry Livingston
 Film Editors: Treg Brown, Hal Geer, Fred Farrell, Chuck McCann, Jim Champin, Lee Gunther
 Producers: Chuck Jones, Friz Freleng, David H. DePatie
 Executive Producers: Chuck Jones, Friz Freleng, David H. DePatie, William L. Hendricks
Cast: Mel Blanc, Stan Freberg, June Foray, Hal Smith, and Arthur Q. Bryan

See also
 Looney Tunes and Merrie Melodies filmography
List of longest-running American television series

References

External links
 

1960s American animated television series
1960s American anthology television series
1970s American animated television series
1970s American anthology television series
1980s American animated television series
1980s American anthology television series
1990s American animated television series
1990s American anthology television series
2000s American animated television series
2000s American anthology television series
1960 American television series debuts
1975 American television series endings
1985 American television series debuts
2000 American television series endings
American children's animated anthology television series
American Broadcasting Company original programming
ABC Kids (TV programming block)
CBS original programming
English-language television shows
Looney Tunes television series
Television series by Warner Bros. Animation
Television series by Warner Bros. Television Studios
Warner Bros. Cartoons
Animated television series about rabbits and hares
Bugs Bunny